Father of All Motherfuckers (also known by the censored title Father of All... or Father of All M***********s, and frequently abbreviated as FOAMF) is the thirteenth studio album by American rock band Green Day, released on February 7, 2020, through Reprise Records. Produced by Butch Walker, Chris Dugan, and the band, the album marks a complete departure from the band's traditional punk rock sound, incorporating garage rock elements similar to their tenth studio album, ¡Dos!.

The album was preceded by four singles: "Father of All...", "Fire, Ready, Aim", "Oh Yeah!" and "Meet Me on the Roof". It debuted atop the UK Albums Chart and Australian ARIA Albums Chart, among others. Despite chart success, the album received polarized reviews from critics and negative reviews from the band's fanbase, with praise for the album's brisk pace and energy, but criticism for its lyrics and runtime. 

Father of All Motherfuckers is Green Day's final album to be released by Reprise Records, with the band fulfilling their contract with the label.

Background
On December 9, 2018, lead vocalist Billie Joe Armstrong revealed that he was writing new songs for an upcoming Green Day album. As recording sessions for the album took place, the band had recorded sixteen songs. However, the band found it difficult to string together all 16 tracks, so they narrowed it down to the ten tracks they felt were the best to make the final cut. 

According to Armstrong, the band wanted to make a "sort of old-timey rock 'n' roll record that traces the history of rock 'n' roll". He stated that the album was inspired by glam rock acts such as "T. Rex or Mott the Hoople, to Martha and the Vandellas, and also some garage rock." "Father of All... feels like it's somewhere in between Prince and MC5," Armstrong said.

Composition
According to lead vocalist Billie Joe Armstrong, the album is "The New! soul, Motown, glam and manic anthemic. Punks, freaks and punishers!" He would also state that the lyrics are about "the life AND death of the party" and the "lifestyle of not giving a fuck." Writers have described the sound of Father of All Motherfuckers as garage rock, alternative rock, garage punk, pop rock, and pop punk. With a running time of 26 minutes and 12 seconds, it is Green Day's shortest album to date.

Packaging
The cover features a repurposed version of the cover art from their 2004 album American Idiot. Armstrong wrote the full album title on the arm, but obscured the word "motherfuckers" with a drawing of a unicorn. The limited edition version of the album uses an uncensored version that lacks the unicorn.

Singles and promotion
The album's lead single and title track, "Father of All...", was released on September 10, 2019. A music video was released on September 19. "Fire, Ready, Aim", was released on October 9 as the official opening theme song for the National Hockey League and NBCSN's Wednesday Night Hockey television broadcasts and as the album's second single. NBCSN also uses "Father of All...", usually during highlights from previous games for the two teams playing on Wednesday Night Hockey.

The album's third single, "Oh Yeah!", was released on January 16, 2020, along with a music video. The song takes its title and samples the chorus from Joan Jett's cover of "Do You Wanna Touch Me", originally sung by Gary Glitter. Acknowledging the latter's sexual abuse history and multiple convictions, the band mentioned they would donate their royalties from the sales of "Oh Yeah!" to International Justice Mission and Rape, Abuse & Incest National Network. The song was used as the one of the official theme songs for the 2020 edition of the WWE PPV, Backlash.

At the same time as the album's release on digital platforms, a music video for the song "Meet Me on the Roof" was released, featuring Gaten Matarazzo as a guest star.

To promote the album, the band announced the Hella Mega Tour with Fall Out Boy and Weezer. Initially planned for March 2020, the tour began on July 24, 2021 following the cancellation of shows in Asia and Oceania, and delays to the North American and European dates due to the ongoing COVID-19 pandemic.

Critical reception

Father of All Motherfuckers received mixed to negative reviews from music critics. At Metacritic, which assigns a normalized rating out of 100 to reviews from mainstream critics, the album has an average critic score of 68 out of 100, which indicates "generally favorable reviews" based on 25 reviews. In 2022, Loudwire published that Father of All Motherfuckers was the highest ranked rock album on a list of the worst albums of the 21st century, which was based on the Metacritic user score of 4.8 out of 10.

Kerrang! magazine rated the album four out of five stars, saying, "Father of All Motherfuckers is just another sign of a band who have always done things their way refusing to do what's expected of them. And it's a hella mega good time from start to finish". Reviewing for Rolling Stone, critic Jon Dolan also gave album four out of five stars, naming it one of Green Day's most fun albums, and writing, "Father of All... is a bountiful act of recovered rock memory, an effortlessly affirming argument that the first mosh pit or car radio contact high you get when you’re 13 years old can be enough to sustain you long into life. Comparing it to their previous work, Q magazine said, "By its very nature, Father of All... is slight compared to a sprawling magnum opus such as 2009's 21st Century Breakdown, but it's close to impossible to emerge from its rapid-fire near-half-hour without a smile on your face."

Conversely, Entertainment Weekly gave the album a middling C−, saying, "At its best, [Father of All] might be the dance party we need, but it's not the one we want." More negatively, Ross Horton of musicOMH awarded it one out of five stars, calling it a disaster and pointing out that it is not a noble failure. Sputnikmusic gave the album a 1.5 out of 5 rating, calling the album "a hot mess that destroys any hope that Green Day could re-emerge as a band worth listening to." Album of the Year called Father of All... Green Day's worst album, stating its pop rock effort "doesn’t even feel like Green Day anymore, apart from the sparse vocal appoggiaturas."<ref name="aoty">{{cite web |title=Green Day - Father of All.." |url=https://www.albumoftheyear.org/user/treylikesbands/album/176376-father-of-all/ |website=Album of the Year |access-date=March 3, 2023}}</ref>

Commercial performanceFather of All Motherfuckers'' debuted at number four on the US Billboard 200 with 48,000 album-equivalent units, including 42,000 pure album sales. It is Green Day's 11th US top-10 album.

Track listing

Notes
"Oh Yeah!" contains a sample of "Do You Wanna Touch Me (Oh Yeah)", written by Gary Glitter and Mike Leander, performed by Joan Jett and the Blackhearts.

Personnel

Green Day
 Billie Joe Armstrong – lead vocals, guitar, design
 Mike Dirnt – bass guitar, backing vocals
 Tré Cool – drums, percussion

Production
Butch Walker – production, engineering
Chris Dugan – production, mixing, engineering
Todd Stopera – assistant engineering
Tchad Blake – mixing
Elin B. – mixing assistant
Brian Lucey – mastering
Nathaniel Mela – drum tech
Andrew Hans Buscher – guitar tech
Chris Bilheimer – design
Pamela Littky – photography

Charts

Weekly charts

Year-end charts

References

2020 albums
Albums produced by Butch Walker
Green Day albums
Reprise Records albums
Pop rock albums by American artists
Garage rock albums by American artists